Mary Gertrude Emmott, Baroness Emmott of Oldham JP (28 April 1866 – 16 November 1954) was a British political activist.

Life 
Emmott was born Mary Gertrude Lees in Waterhead Mill, Oldham, Lancashire (now part of Greater Manchester), and studied at Queen's College, London. She married Alfred Emmott, a local Liberal Party councillor on 5 October 1887; they had two children. She became involved in liberal politics, was a founder member of the local branch of the National Society for the Prevention of Cruelty to Children, and the main founder of a local branch of the National Union of Women Workers (NUWW).

In 1898, Emmott was elected to the Oldham Board of Guardians, becoming its first female member. The following year, Alfred was elected as a Member of Parliament, and the couple relocated to London. There, she became a vice-chair of the national Women's Liberal Federation, served on the executive of the London Society for Women's Suffrage, and chaired the NUWW's Parliamentary and Legislation Committee. In 1911, Alfred was raised to the peerage, Mary thereby becoming Baroness Emmott. She was appointed a Justice of the Peace.

During World War I, Emmott spent her time supporting Belgian refugees and, as a result, received the Queen Elisabeth Medal. At the 1922 United Kingdom general election, she stood for the Oldham seat herself, but took a distant fifth place.  She remained active on the committees of many organisations, principally feminist and women's groups, for the remainder of her life, and was serving as the president of the Fawcett Society in 1954, when she died.

References

External links
 Emmott, Mary Gertrude (1886–1954), wife of 1st Baron Emmott – link to papers of official committees on which she sat (held in London School of Economics, The Women's Library)

1866 births
1954 deaths
British baronesses
English suffragists
Liberal Party (UK) parliamentary candidates
People educated at Queen's College, London
People from Oldham
National Society for the Prevention of Cruelty to Children people